The Powerhouse Fire was a wildfire in northern Los Angeles County, California, mostly in the Angeles National Forest. It started at approximately 3:30 PM on May 30, 2013. It was 100% contained by June 10, 2013.

The fire burned more than 30,000 acres and destroyed 53 structures, including 24 homes. At the fire's peak it threatened more than 1,000 structures. Two thousand firefighters were deployed to fight the fire. The communities of Lake Hughes, Elizabeth Lake, and Green Valley were evacuated.

The fire never posed a threat to urban areas because the majority of the blaze was located in Angeles National Forest. The Powerhouse Fire did pose a threat to local forests as well as to powerlines, watershed areas, and the habitats of threatened and endangered species.

References

2013 California wildfires
Wildfires in Los Angeles County, California